Tribasodites is a genus of beetle in the family Staphylinidae.

Species 
Species accepted within Tribasodites include:

 Tribasodites abnormalis
 Tribasodites antennalis
 Tribasodites bama
 Tribasodites bedosae
 Tribasodites biyun
 Tribasodites cehengensis
 Tribasodites coiffaiti
 Tribasodites deharvengi
 Tribasodites frontalis
 Tribasodites hubeiensis
 Tribasodites kawadai
 Tribasodites liboensis
 Tribasodites picticornis
 Tribasodites semipunctatus
 Tribasodites setosiventris
 Tribasodites spinacaritus
 Tribasodites thailandicus
 Tribasodites tiani
 Tribasodites tianmuensis
 Tribasodites uenoi
 Tribasodites xingyiensis

References

Staphylinidae
Insects of China
Beetles described in 1960
Pselaphinae genera